Ehrenreich (German for "rich in honour") is a surname that was adopted by diverse families in Germany when surnames were legally required. Most people with this name are of Jewish heritage, but there are also people of this name with Catholic heritage. Notable people with the surname include:

Alden Ehrenreich (born 1989), American actor
Alfred Ehrenreich (1882–1931), American ichthyologist
Barbara Ehrenreich (1941–2022), American writer and columnist
Ben Ehrenreich (born 1972), American freelance journalist and novelist, son of Barbara
Martin Ehrenreich (born 1983), Austrian football defender
Moses Levi Ehrenreich (1818–1899), Polish-Italian rabbi
Ron Ehrenreich (born 1950), American credit union officer and teacher

German-language surnames
Jewish surnames
Yiddish-language surnames